Marc Janssens (born 13 November 1968 in Duffel) is a Belgian former cyclo-cross cyclist.

Professional from 1993 to 2001, he won the Belgian national cyclo-cross championship three times. He also won the Gazet van Antwerpen Trophy twice, placed third in the World Cup twice, and finished second in the 1996 Superprestige. After his racing career, he became a commentator of cyclo-cross competitions on the Flemish TV channel VT4. He is also currently a directeur sportif for the  team.

Major results

Cyclo-cross

1987
 1st  Junior World Championships
1993
 1st Azencross
1994
 2nd Overall Superprestige
 3rd Overall UCI World Cup
1995
 1st  National Cyclo-cross Championships
 4th Overall Superprestige
1996
 1st Niel Jaarmarkt Cyclo-cross
 6th Overall Superprestige
1997
 1st Nationale Cyclo-Cross Otegem
 3rd Overall UCI World Cup
 5th Overall Superprestige
1998
 1st  National Cyclo-cross Championships
 1st Azencross
 4th Overall UCI World Cup
1999
 1st  National Cyclo-cross Championships
 5th Overall UCI World Cup
2002
 1st Cyclophile Aigle

Road

1989
 1st Stage 5 Tour de la province de Namur
1991
 1st Stage 1 Tour de Liège
 1st Stage 3 Tour de la province de Namur
1992
 1st Stages 4a & 4b (ITT) Tour de Liège
1993
 1st Liège–Bastogne–Liège U23
 3rd Overall Tour de Liège
1st Stages 1 & 3

References

External links 

Belgian male cyclists
1968 births
Living people
People from Duffel
Cyclists from Antwerp Province
20th-century Belgian people